Detern is a municipality in the district of Leer, in Lower Saxony, Germany.

The Battle of Detern was fought here in 1426.

References

Towns and villages in East Frisia
Leer (district)